Donald Leslie Gemmell (27 December 1932  22 June 2022) was a New Zealand rower.

Gemmell was born in 1932 in Wanganui, New Zealand. He represented New Zealand at the 1956 Summer Olympics. He is listed as New Zealand Olympian athlete number 90 by the New Zealand Olympic Committee.

References

1932 births
2022 deaths
New Zealand male rowers
Rowers at the 1956 Summer Olympics
Olympic rowers of New Zealand
Rowers from Whanganui
Rowers at the 1958 British Empire and Commonwealth Games
Commonwealth Games competitors for New Zealand